Ariano may refer to:

Places
 Ariano Irpino, Campania, Italy
 Ariano di Puglia until 1930
 Ariano nel Polesine, Veneto, Italy
 , Mesola, Emilia-Romagna, Italy
 Ariano, Olevano sul Tusciano, Campania, Italy

People
 Ariano Fernandes (born 1963), Brazilian politician
 Ariano Suassuna (1927–2014), Brazilian playwright
 Azmahar Ariano (born 1991), Panamanian footballer

See also

 Assizes of Ariano, a 12th-century constitution for the Kingdom of Sicily